The Malicious Communications Act 1988 (MCA) is a British Act of Parliament that makes it illegal in England and Wales to "send or deliver letters or other articles for the purpose of causing distress or anxiety". It also applies to electronic communications.

Scope of application
The original purpose of the MCA was to prevent the sending of printed matter, but the scope of the act has been extended to cover electronic communications. The MCA can be used to charge people for comments made via social networking sites that are “racially motivated” or "religiously motivated."

Criticisms
The MCA has been criticised for its aim as a means to censor free speech, a core civil liberty. In 2012 an individual was falsely arrested under the Act for saying that Olympic diver Tom Daley let his late father down by not winning a medal at the London Olympics.

Highlighted cases
The MCA was successfully used against Internet troll Sean Duffy who harassed the family of Natasha MacBryde after her death. In the case of DPP v Connolly, the MCA was used to prosecute an anti-abortion campaigner who sent obscene images of fetuses to pharmacists who sold the contraceptive pill.

See also 
 Censorship in the United Kingdom
 Hate mail

References

External links 

 
  Man jailed over tsunami e-mails
 

Acts of the Parliament of the United Kingdom concerning England and Wales
United Kingdom Acts of Parliament 1988
Communications in the United Kingdom